Cyana arenbergeri is a moth of the family Erebidae. It was described by Timm Karisch in 2003. It is found in Tanzania.

References

arenbergeri
Moths described in 2003
Endemic fauna of Tanzania
Insects of Tanzania
Moths of Africa